The 1908 Princeton Tigers football team represented Princeton University in the 1908 college football season. The team finished with a 5–2–3 record under third-year head coach Bill Roper. Princeton halfback Frederick Tibbott was selected as a consensus first-team honoree on the 1908 College Football All-America Team, and tackle Rudolph Siegling also received first-team honors from multiple selectors.

Schedule

References

Princeton
Princeton Tigers football seasons
Princeton Tigers football